Beek is a village in the Dutch province of Gelderland. It is located in the municipality Montferland, about 5 km southeast of Didam.

History 
It was first mentioned in 1206 as Beke, and means brook. The St Martinus Church dates from 1868. The tower was built in 1884 and has 15th century elements. The guild house St. Jan was constructed in 1897. In 1840, it was home to 573 people.

Notable people 
 Clemens Westerhof (born 1940), football manager

Gallery

References

Populated places in Gelderland
Montferland